Ole Petter Skonnord (born 6 July 1968) is a retired Norwegian football striker.

He hails from Ridabu. He joined Hamarkameratene as a child and got one season on senior level before moving on to Elverum in 1989. In 1994 he rejoined Hamarkameratene, now in Eliteserien, and got 12 games. He moved down one level to Skeid, but won promotion to 1996 Eliteserien where he played 24 games. Not offered a new contract with Skeid in 1997, he went on trial with Dundee F.C. during the winter of 1996–97, but was ultimately not offered a transfer. Instead he joined Kjelsås, where he managed 15 goals in the 1998 1. divisjon.

His son Olav Henrik Skonnord has also played for Kjelsås as well as Nardo.

References

1968 births
Living people
Sportspeople from Hamar
Norwegian footballers
Hamarkameratene players
Elverum Fotball players
Skeid Fotball players
Kjelsås Fotball players
Eliteserien players
Norwegian First Division players
Expatriate footballers in Scotland
Dundee F.C. players
Scottish Football League players
Association football forwards